Claude Montmarquette  (20 December 1942 – 8 September 2021) was a Canadian economist. He taught at the Université de Montréal for several decades.

Biography
Montmarquette studied at the Université de Montréal and earned a degree in economic sciences. He then earned a Ph.D. from the University of Chicago. He became a researcher at CIRANO and at the Centre de recherche en développement économique. He became a member of the Royal Society of Canada in 1998 for his contributions to the fields of experimental economics and applied econometrics. In 2005, he was a signatory of Pour un Québec lucide.

Montmarquette led the experimental economics department at the Université de Montréal from 2005 to 2012. He became a Member of the Order of Canada in 2012. In 2013, he became a doctor honoris causa at McGill University.

Claude Montmarquette died in Montreal on 8 September 2021 at the age of 78.

Articles
Taxation and the Labor Market: An Experimental Study (2005)
Aspiration Levels and Educational Choices : an Experimental Study (2006)
Responsabilité individuelle et fiscalité (2006)

References

1942 births
2021 deaths
French Quebecers
Canadian economists
People from Montreal
Université de Montréal alumni
University of Chicago alumni
Academic staff of the Université de Montréal
Fellows of the Royal Society of Canada
Members of the Order of Canada